George Papanicolaou or Papanikolaou may refer to:

 Georgios Papanikolaou (1883–1962), Greek pathologist
 George C. Papanicolaou (born 1943), American mathematician
 Giorgos Papanikolaou (born 1977), Greek politician, Member of the European Parliament
  (born Georgios Papanikolaou in 1976), Greek Orthodox metropolitan bishop of Nea Ionia and Philadelphia; see Church of Greece

See also 
 Papanicolaou or Papanikolaou, a surname